Cédric Di Dio Balsamo (born 27 March 1994) is a French ice hockey player for Ducs d'Angers and the French national team.

He represented France at the 2019 IIHF World Championship.

References

External links

1994 births
Living people
Diables Rouges de Briançon players
Ducs d'Angers players
French ice hockey forwards
LHC Les Lions players
Rapaces de Gap players
People from Briançon
Sportspeople from Hautes-Alpes